Schoenus imberbis, the beardless bog rush, is a species of sedge within the genus Schoenus, found in the states of Victoria and New South Wales in Australia. Often seen growing in dry eucalyptus forest or heath on sandy soils. This is one of the many plants first published by Robert Brown with the type known as "(J.) v.v." It appears in his Prodromus Florae Novae Hollandiae et Insulae Van Diemen in 1810.

References

imberbis
Flora of New South Wales
Flora of Victoria (Australia)
Plants described in 1810
Taxa named by Robert Brown (botanist, born 1773)